Churchill Park Historic District is a national historic district located at Stamford in Delaware County, New York, United States. The district contains 52 contributing buildings.  It consists of a group of structures built between 1870 and 1920 as summer homes, hotels, and boarding houses.

It was listed on the National Register of Historic Places in 1980.

See also
National Register of Historic Places listings in Delaware County, New York

References

National Register of Historic Places in Delaware County, New York
Historic districts on the National Register of Historic Places in New York (state)
Historic districts in Delaware County, New York